This is a comparison of applications in regard to their support of the IPv6 protocol.

References

IPv6
Computing comparisons